Willie Ouchterlonie was a Scottish footballer who played as a striker. He was born in Dundee.

Ouchterlonie, whose brother Kinnaird was also a footballer, began his career with local side Osborne before joining Dundee United in September 1932. After scoring forty league goals in fifty-one matches, Ouchterlonie was surprisingly released in April 1934, going on to join Raith Rovers. He later played for Portadown F.C. in Northern Ireland as well as a season at Reds United in the League of Ireland before having spells with Barrow and Wrexham before a one-game return to Tannadice in January 1940 where he scored twice.

References

Footballers from Dundee
Scottish footballers
Scottish Football League players
Dundee United F.C. players
Raith Rovers F.C. players
Barrow A.F.C. players
Wrexham A.F.C. players
Year of birth missing
Year of death missing
Association football forwards